Wictor is both a surname and a given name. Notable people with the name include:

 Pat Wictor (born 1966), American blues and folk musician, guitarist, singer-songwriter, and recording artist
 Wictor Esbensen (1881–1942), Norwegian mariner
 Wictor Sajeni, Malawian politician